Derg Bridge Halt railway station served Derg Bridge in County Donegal, Ireland.

The station opened on 2 December 1912 on the West Donegal Railway line from Stranorlar to Donegal.

It closed on 1 January 1960.

Routes

References

Disused railway stations in County Donegal
Railway stations opened in 1912
Railway stations closed in 1960
1912 establishments in Ireland
Railway stations in the Republic of Ireland opened in the 20th century